The Snow Queen is a 1995 British animated film directed by Martin Gates and inspired by Hans Christian Andersen's 1844 fairy tale The Snow Queen, featuring Helen Mirren in the titular role. A direct sequel, The Snow Queen's Revenge, was released the following year.

In the film, the evil Snow Queen plans to use an enormous magic mirror to so that it will plunge the world into a perpetual winter so she can take it over, but when the mirror shatters and one piece enters the young Tom's body, she kidnaps him to have all the pieces. Tom's sister Ellie and her friend, Peeps the sparrow, set out to rescue him before it is too late.

Plot
Ellie and her brother Tom listen to their grandmother reading them a story about the Snow Queen. When their younger sister Polly asks if she is coming, Tom says that she only exists in the story. However, the Queen really does live in an icy palace in the North Pole with her three troll servants: Eric, Baggy, and Wardrobe. Her plan is to set up her huge magic mirror on a mountain to reflect the sunlight away so the entire world will become her kingdom, but the mirror falls down the mountain and shatters into pieces. Two of its pieces hit Tom in the eye and the heart and he falls under a curse which turns him dark of spirit.

The Snow Queen sends her bats to retrieve the pieces. As they cannot take the two that are inside Tom, the Queen goes out to kidnap him herself. Ellie and Tom connect their sleds to a bigger sled that is revealed to be driven by the Queen. She takes Tom to her palace and cuts Ellie off, causing her to fall onto a talking sparrow named Peeps. Ellie goes out to save Tom and Peeps reluctantly decides to go with her. In a snowy forest, they find a house belonging to an old woman, who appears nice, but is actually a sly witch who traps them to use Ellie's heart for her elixir of life so she can be eternally young. Peeps tricks the witch's cat, Cuddles, into chasing after him and knocking over the elixir of life, and uses the confusion to unlock Ellie from her cage. Ellie and Peeps escape and trap the old woman and her cat in the basement by putting a box over the trapdoor, so they can avoid being chased by the old woman.

They then meet two humanoid ravens named Les and Ivy, who, from Ellie's description of Tom, tell her that Tom is going to marry princess Amy, so Ellie becomes a member of the staff to serve the princess her food. However, she soon discovers that prince Sherman is not Tom. Meanwhile, Tom is rebuilding the Snow Queen's mirror, as he is good at puzzles. The trolls try to warn him that the Queen is going to kill him to get the last two pieces, but the Queen convinces him otherwise and kisses him, putting him into a hypnotic state while his veins are full of ice, and will cause his death when it reaches his heart.

Amy and Sherman give Ellie and Peeps a royal vehicle to ride to the Snow Queen's dominion, but they run into a robber gang of humanoid rats. The Robber King promises his daughter, Angorra, that Ellie can become her slave, but later changes his mind. Ellie is locked in a room with a flying reindeer Dimly who was captured by the robbers. Peeps enters the room and unties Ellie's hands, and she unties Dimly. Angorra enters, but they trap her with a barrel. Dimly flies them away, but the King grabs onto the rope that is still wrapped around Dimly, resulting in the King slamming into a building and falling over the edge on top of Angorra.

Dimly does not know where the Snow Queen is, so he goes to his flying reindeer school and asks Freda, an old Lapland woman who runs the school. Freda has Dimly fly them over to the Queen's castle. There, they meet the three trolls, who ultimately decide to help them. Tom does not have much time left, and has finished putting the mirror together except for the two pieces that are inside him. Freda reveals that the pieces inside him will kill him, then makes a potion that will dissolve the mirror. Ellie tells Tom to drink it, but just as he is about to, the Queen blasts the vial away with her magic staff. They fight the Queen, but she freezes Eric and Freda, and Baggy and Wardrobe grab her staff just as they are frozen as well. The battle eventually causes the vial to fall on top of the mirror and shatter, dissolving the mirror and forming an icy cyclone that chases after the Queen's flying carriage and freezes her solid as she attempts to escape. The mirror pieces inside Tom dissolve and the effects of the Queen's kiss go away, freeing him. Freda and the trolls are unfrozen.

Freda warns the Snow Queen is not dead and might return in the future. She has Dimly take Ellie, Tom, and Peeps back to the village, and then come back for her and the trolls. Dimly crash lands in the village and Ellie, Tom, and Peeps go to listen to the rest of the story as Dimly heads back to the Queen's palace. The film ends with a close-up shot of the frozen Queen's eyes lighting up.

Voices
 Ellie Beaven as Ellie, a courageous and optimistic girl with a kind heart.
 Helen Mirren as the Snow Queen, the oppressive monarch of the North and South Poles.
 Damian Hunt as Tom, the intelligent twin brother of Ellie.
 Hugh Laurie as Peeps, a house sparrow and Ellie's best friend.
 Gary Martin as Dimly, a reindeer who struggles with flying.
 Julia McKenzie as Grandma, the grandmother of Ellie, Tom and Polly who looks after them; Old Woman, a polite woman who is secretly an evil witch; and Freda, the Headmistress of a flying school for Reindeer.
 David Jason as Eric, the leader of the trolls and the Snow Queen's army.
 Colin Marsh as Baggy, a bumbling troll and Wardrobe's best friend.
 Russell Floyd as Wardrobe, a dim-witted troll and the kindest of the three.
 Scarlett Strallen as Princess Amy, an energetic and playful girl who is a Princess.
 Rik Mayall as the Robber King, a rat who is the leader of a gang of thieves.
 Richard Tate as Les, a raven who works for the Royal Household and the husband of Ivy.
 Imelda Staunton as Ivy, a raven who likes picking flowers and the wife of Les; and Angorra, a rat who is also the spoiled and bratty daughter of the Robber King.
 Rowan D'Albert as Prince Sherman, an immature but clever boy with a big appetite who has recently married Princess Amy.
 Zizi Vaigncourt Strallen as Polly, the younger sister of Ellie and Tom.

Production and release
The Snow Queen had been in production since 1991, but was completed only in 1995. This was in part due to the legal problems in the Philippines. Both it and its sequel were separately released on DVD by Universal/Right Entertainment in 2003 in the UK, and then together as a double-pack in 2005. Outside the United Kingdom, such as the United States and Russia, Warner Bros held the rights, and released it straight to VHS in 1998 and later on DVD in 2004.

Reception
Jack Zipes called it "highly comic [and] neatly drawn", praising the "numerous changes that liven the action and transform the plot in unusual ways". He wrote that "there's nothing glitzy in this animated film and yet it sparkles with an unusual approach to a humourless tale".

Sequel

The Snow Queen's Revenge is a 1996 sequel in which the Snow Queen returns to life, setting out to seek revenge on those who ruined her plans to rule the world, and it is up to young Ellie and her friends to stop her again. Some of the voice cast changed in the second film.

References

Sources
Toonhound - The Snow Queen (1995)

External links

1990s fantasy adventure films
1990s musical fantasy films
1995 animated films
1995 films
Animated musical films
British musical fantasy films
British animated fantasy films
British children's adventure films
British children's animated films
British children's fantasy films
British fantasy adventure films
Films based on The Snow Queen
Films about witchcraft
Films set in palaces
1990s children's fantasy films
1990s children's animated films
1990s English-language films
1990s British films